Britt Hawes  (born 13 March 1990) is a New Zealand freestyle skier who competes internationally. She represented New Zealand in the 2018 Winter Olympics.

References

1990 births
Living people
New Zealand female freestyle skiers 
Olympic freestyle skiers of New Zealand
Freestyle skiers at the 2018 Winter Olympics